In the mathematical theory of Riemann surfaces, the first Hurwitz triplet is a triple of distinct Hurwitz surfaces with the identical automorphism group of the lowest possible genus, namely 14 (genera 3 and 7 each admit a unique Hurwitz surface, respectively the Klein quartic and the Macbeath surface).  The explanation for this phenomenon is arithmetic. Namely, in the ring of integers of the appropriate number field, the rational prime 13 splits as a product of three distinct prime ideals. The principal congruence subgroups defined by the triplet of primes produce Fuchsian groups corresponding to the triplet of Riemann surfaces.

Arithmetic construction
Let  be the real subfield of  where  is a 7th-primitive root of unity. 
Let  be the quaternion algebra, or symbol algebra . Let .

where  is invertible. Also consider the prime ideals generated by the non-invertible factors. The principal congruence subgroup defined by such a prime ideal I is by definition the group

namely, the group of elements of reduced norm 1 in  equivalent to 1 modulo the ideal .  The corresponding Fuchsian group is obtained as the image of the principal congruence subgroup under a representation to PSL(2,R).

Each of the three Riemann surfaces in the first Hurwitz triplet can be formed as a Fuchsian model, the quotient of the hyperbolic plane by one of these three Fuchsian groups.

Bound for systolic length and the systolic ratio
The Gauss–Bonnet theorem states that 

In the case  we have

 and 

thus we obtain that the area of these surfaces is 

.

The lower bound on the systole as specified in [2], namely 

is 3.5187.

Some specific details about each of the surfaces are presented in the following tables (the number of systolic loops is taken from [3]). The term Systolic Trace refers to the least reduced trace of an element in the corresponding subgroup .  The systolic ratio is the ratio of the square of the systole to the area.

See also
(2,3,7) triangle group

References

Riemann surfaces
Differential geometry of surfaces
Systolic geometry